Eddie Eastman (born July 15, 1949 in Terra Nova, Newfoundland and Labrador) is a Canadian country music singer-songwriter. Twenty-five of Eastman's singles made the RPM Country Tracks charts, including five which reached the Top Ten. Eastman won the Juno Award for Country Male Vocalist of the Year in 1981 and 1983.

Eastman was inducted into the Canadian Country Music Hall of Fame in 2010.

Discography

Albums

Singles

Guest singles

References

External links
 Eddie Eastmen – Encyclopedia of Newfoundland and Labrador, v. 1, p. 665
 Eddie Eastman – Heritage Newfoundland and Labrador

1949 births
Living people
Canadian country singer-songwriters
Canadian male singer-songwriters
Musicians from Newfoundland and Labrador
Juno Award winners